Skënder Shengyli (Serbian: Скендер Шенгуљ/Skender Šengulj, born 15 February 1960 in Prizren) is a Kosovar Albanian football former player.

Managerial career
A former manager of Prishtina and Ferizaj, he was appointed manager of Vëllaznimi in March 2016, only to be sacked in July that year.

Shengyli was favorite to retake the helm at Liria Prizren in March 2019.

References

External links
 Forum.b92.net
 

1960 births
Living people
Sportspeople from Prizren
Association football defenders
Yugoslav footballers
Kosovan footballers
KF Liria players
FC Prishtina players
Karşıyaka S.K. footballers
Yugoslav First League players
Kosovan expatriate footballers
Expatriate footballers in Turkey
Kosovan expatriate sportspeople in Turkey
Kosovan football managers
FC Prishtina managers
KF Ferizaj managers
KF Liria managers
KF Vëllaznimi managers